Philip Campbell Wehle (September 5, 1906 – September 20, 1978) was a major general in the U.S. Army and the commanding general of the Military District of Washington (MDW) (CG MDW) from 1963 to 1965.

Biography

Wehle was born in Westport, Connecticut, the son of John William Wehle, Sr. and Catherine Veronica Campbell Wehle.  His older brother, John William Wehle, Jr. rose to Brigadier General in the Marines Corps.  The boys were raised in Norwalk.

He graduated from Norwalk High School in 1924 then attended West Point, graduating in the Class of 1930 in June.

During World War II, Wehle served a tour of duty in the Pacific Theater of Operations, where he was attached to the first Joint Army-Navy Task Force.

After his return to the United States, Wehle was transferred to Camp Hale, Colorado, where he was appointed commanding officer of an artillery battalion. He was subsequently assigned to the staff of the XVIII Airborne Corps at Fort Bragg, North Carolina, as an assistant artillery officer.

He next participated in the Battle of the Bulge, Rhineland Campaign and the Central European Campaign. For his service in this capacity, Colonel Wehle was decorated with the Legion of Merit.

After the Second World War, he served with the Allied Occupation Forces in Heidelberg, Germany, and subsequently in the Plans Section until 1949.

He was later appointed the Secretary of the General Staff, Army Field Forces Headquarters at Fort Monroe, Virginia. In 1950, Wehle was transferred back to Europe, to serve as chief of the personnel branch of United States Army, Europe.

Returning to the United States, Wehle graduated from the Army War College in 1953.

In August 1963, Wehle was appointed the commanding general of the Military District of Washington. As CG MDW, he helped plan three state funerals, all of which happened within a span of 12 months:
Presidents:
John F. Kennedy (November 1963)
Herbert Hoover (October 1964)
Five-star general:
Douglas MacArthur (April 1964)

All three state funerals General Wehle helped plan had one thing in common: the riderless horse was Black Jack. Black Jack would be the riderless horse in one more state funeral: that of President Lyndon B. Johnson in 1973.

For his service as the Commanding General of the Military District of Washington, Major General Wehle was decorated with the Army Distinguished Service Medal.

He subsequently retired from the Army on September 19, 1965.

Following his retirement, Wehle worked on the staff of the Research and Analysis Corporation in McLean, Virginia. He later taught English language and History at the Heights School in Washington, D.C.

Major General Philip C. Wehle died on September 20, 1978 at Walter Reed Army Hospital, following complications from lung cancer.

He was interred together with his wife Eloise McElroy Wehle (1911-1977) in Arlington National Cemetery.

Decorations

Here is the ribbon bar of Major General Wehle:

Notes

1906 births
1978 deaths
People from Westport, Connecticut
People from Norwalk, Connecticut
Norwalk High School (Connecticut) alumni
United States Military Academy alumni
Military personnel from Connecticut
United States Army personnel of World War II
United States Army War College alumni
Recipients of the Legion of Merit
United States Army generals
Recipients of the Distinguished Service Medal (US Army)
Deaths from lung cancer
Burials at Arlington National Cemetery